Brecht is a municipality located in the Belgian province of Antwerp. In 2021, Brecht had a total population of 29,809. The total area is 90.84 km².

Brecht is a fast-growing municipality in the north of the Antwerp province, near the Dutch border. Noorderkempen, a railway station on the HSL 4, opened on 15 June 2009.

Images

Notable people
 Jan van der Noot (1539–1595), writer and poet, born in Brecht
 Leonard Lessius (1554-1623), moral theologian, born in Brecht
 Walter Van Beirendonck (1957-), fashion designer and one of the Antwerp Six
 Jean Kockerols (1958-), Roman Catholic bishop

Climate

See also
 Brecht Abbey
 Noorderkempen railway station

References

External links

  Official website
  Tourism in Brecht

 
Municipalities of Antwerp Province
Populated places in Antwerp Province